= Veeve =

- Company type: Privately held company
- Founded: 2011; 15 years ago
- Founder: Jonny Morris; Claire Whisker
- Headquarters: London, UK
- Area served: London
- Key people: Jonny Morris (Chief Executive Officer)
- Website: www.veeve.com

Veeve is a home sharing service for London homeowners. It was founded (as Vive Unique) in 2011 by Jonny Morris and Claire Whisker (a former lawyer and barrister). Veeve opened its first office, in Hoxton, in April 2012 with 200 private home rentals. In May 2014 the company received backing of £3.5 million from sharing economy specialists Smedvig Capital, and in June 2014 the company opened its second office in Battersea.

In summer 2014 the company stated that the number of homeowners signing up to its service had increased fourfold. In November 2015, Smedvig Capital made a further investment in the company taking their total funding to £7 million.

The company agrees a fixed weekly rate with homeowners taking into account factors such as location, quality, availability and how many the property can sleep.
